Indigenous or Aboriginal rock is a style of music which mixes  rock music with the instrumentation and singing styles of Indigenous peoples. Two countries with prominent Aboriginal rock scenes are Australia and Canada.

Australia

In Australia, Aboriginal rock mixes rock styles and instruments (e.g. electric (guitar, bass and drums)  with Indigenous Australian instruments such as the Didgeridoo and clapsticks. Aboriginal rock is mostly performed by Indigenous bands, although some bands include non-Aboriginal members.

Bands include Yothu Yindi, Us Mob and No Fixed Address. Yothu Yindi, with vocalist Mandawuy Yunupingu has politicised lyrics, such as 1991's "Treaty." Other songs relate more generally to Aboriginal culture. Another major band is the Warumpi Band, which toured with Midnight Oil. The Warumpi Band focuses more on the Aboriginal aspects of the music, rather than the rock sound of Yothu Yindi. In the 2000s, Aboriginal bands such as NoKTuRNL have adopted a rap metal or nu metal sound. Formal training institutions include the Government sponsored  Aboriginal Centre for the Performing Arts.

Famous songs include Treaty, My Island Home, and Blackfella/Whitefella.

Canada

Indigenous peoples in Canada include First Nations, Métis and Inuit. Some examples of Canadian Indigenous rock bands or artists include Road Engine Dreams (AKA: R.E.D.), A Tribe Called Red, Edward Gamblin, George Leach, Derek Miller, Breach of Trust, Kashtin, Bruthers of Different Muthers, Digging Roots and Burnt Project 1.

Ecuador
Several mestizo-bands in Ecuador made use of indigenous musical elements in rock music since the 1990s. Rocola Bacalao integrated Andean rhythms and made in their song-texts references to emblematic indigenous towns, such as Pujilí in Cotopaxi. Sal y Mileto and Casería de Lagartos coined the genre of new Ecuadorian Rock. Nevertheless, in the 1980s and the early 1990s the rhythm of the social as expressed in Ecuadorian rock was characterized by hopelessness and resistance or even resignation against repression. With the emergence of a powerful indigenous movement the rhythm changed. The most emblematic references towards the political impact of the indigenous movement are made by the metalband Aztra and the hardcore band CURARE at the beginning of the 2000s, during the heyday of indigenous social protest against neoliberalism and for (ethnic) democratization.

See also

:Category:Australian Aboriginal art
List of Indigenous Australian musicians

References

Further reading
Australia
Dunbar-Hall, Peter (1997). Music and Meaning: The Aboriginal Rock Album, Australian Aboriginal Studies, 1997/1, pp. 38–47

External links

21st-century music genres
Rock music genres
Australian Aboriginal music
First Nations music
Fusion music genres
Australian styles of music